Todd was an electoral district of the House of Assembly in the Australian state of South Australia from 1977 to 1993. The new seat of Torrens absorbed much of the abolished seat of Todd at the 1991 redistribution.

Members

Election results

References

External links
1985 & 1989 election boundaries, page 18 & 19

Former electoral districts of South Australia
1977 establishments in Australia
1993 disestablishments in Australia
Constituencies established in 1977
Constituencies disestablished in 1993